The Roberts Octagon Barn built in 1883 is an historic octagonal barn located on CR W62 near Sharon Center, Johnson County, Iowa. On June 30, 1986, it was added to the National Register of Historic Places.

In 1986 it was believed to be one of the oldest surviving round barns in Iowa.  It appears to be a "Coffin-type octagon barn" (i.e. derivative of the first octagon barn built in Iowa, in 1867, by Lorenzo Coffin).  This type includes having a non-self-supporting modified hip roof, heavy timber construction, a rectangular interior plan, and general purpose function.

References

External links
 Dale Travis' Iowa Round Barns List
 Dale J. Travis photo of and directions to Roberts Octagon Barn

Infrastructure completed in 1883
Buildings and structures in Johnson County, Iowa
Octagon barns in the United States
Barns on the National Register of Historic Places in Iowa
National Register of Historic Places in Johnson County, Iowa